Below are the squads for the 1973 Palestine Cup of Nations, hosted in Libya, and which took place between 11 and 26 August 1973.

Group A

Egypt

North Yemen

Palestine

Syria

Tunisia

Group B

Algeria
Head coach: Saïd Amara

Iraq

Libya

South Yemen

United Arab Emirates

External links
Palestine Cup 1973 - rsssf.com

1973